Matt Goias (born October 12, 1977) is a New York City-based entrepreneur, music producer and writer.

Early years
Matt Goias was born in Edison, New Jersey and spent his childhood and teenage years living in New Jersey and New York.  He began collecting records and djing at the age of 11, and spun in a Manhattan nightclub for the first time at age 14.

As a teenager he went on to co-found the weekly hip-hop party Indie 5000 (along with DJ Max Glazer, artist Stephen “ESPO” Powers, and Ari Forman of On The Go Magazine). With Goias at the helm, Indie 5000 hosted weekly, celebrity, guest DJs including Cipha Sounds, Peanut Butter Wolf, PF Cuttin, Lord Finesse, DJ Premier, Kid Capri, DJ Soul, Lord Sear, and Prince Paul. At 22 years old, Goias was profiled by Vogue Magazine and named the “Jack of Clubs” for his work on the cultural scene.

Marketing career
Goias is currently a partner of The Class Trip Corporation, a marketing entity based in New York City.

Musical production
In 2003, Goias help found the hit musical group FannyPack.  The band's hit single Cameltoe described the female apparel phenomenon and was number one on Carson Daly’s Total Request Live radio show for five consecutive weeks. Signed to Tommy Boy Records, the group released two critically praised albums. The first was 2003’s So Stylistic, which was followed in 2005 by See You Next Tuesday. By 2005, the band had performed in 15 countries and received hundreds of articles in publications around the globe.

Goias reunited with  DJ Fancy as well as DJ Max Glazer to form 'Business Class', a music development entity.

Other concepts
Recently, Goias and artist Steve Powers collaborated on an art show in Paris’ Colette boutique entitle L’Attraction de la Boue to commemorate World Aids Day 2009.

The Bench
Goias, along with Max Glazer, Ari Saal Forman, and Fancy, garnered media attention with the creation of "The Bench" on the corner of Houston and Orchard Streets in New York City. The conceptual piece was an exercise in "creating something out of nothing meant to raise questions about what exactly it is that makes an event or place "cool" or "relevant." The goal was to prove that with the right combination of attendees, artwork, location, and viral propaganda, the artists involved would be able to make nothing at all, four friends sitting on a bench, the "coolest" party in New York City. The “event” was covered extensively by Gawker, Time Out New York, Gothamist, AdBusters, and The New York Observer. Goias and The Bench were featured on the cover of the Arts and Culture section of The New York Observer on August 7, 2007.

Published work
As a writer, Goias has written a monthly column called "Sexytime Explosion" in Mass Appeal Magazine and one called "The Gospel According to Matthew" in Missbehave Magazine. He has also contributed to Complex Magazine and YRB.

References

 Saneh, Kalefa (2003-05-23), Fashion Tip in Rap For Brooklyn Girls, New York Times
 Reagan, Gillian (2007-08-07), The Bench Bunch, The New York Observer
 Chaplin, Julia (No. 1, Vol. 31; Pg. 82), One Stop Pop Shop, Interview Magazine
 New York Times Filmography
 Carioli, Carly (2004-02-27), Novelty Numbers, The Portland Phoenix
 Colette Overview of L’attraction de la Boue
 Orloff, Brian (2005-03-08), Fannypack Do Dirty Reggae, Rolling Stone
 Louie, Rebecca (2003-06-04), Fannypack Fever, New York Daily News
 D’Angelo, Joe (2003-05-09), 'Cameltoe' Making An Impression On Booty Shakers, Bagel Buyers, New York Daily News

1977 births
Living people
Businesspeople from New York City
Record producers from New York (state)
Writers from New Jersey